La Victoria is an American brand of Mexican food products, in particular jar and bottled salsas. They were founded in Los Angeles in 1917, and introduced the first jar salsa product in the US, Salsa Brava, a true Mexican-style salsa, still sold today. In 1941, Henry Tanklage created the La Victoria Sales Company, introducing green and red taco sauce, and enchilada sauces. They are currently a division of Hormel, one of their MegaMex Foods brands.

References

External links
Official website

1917 establishments in California
Food and drink companies established in 1917
Manufacturing companies based in Los Angeles
Mexican cuisine
Food and drink companies based in California
Condiment companies of the United States